MK-4409 is an experimental drug which acts as a potent and selective inhibitor of the enzyme fatty acid amide hydrolase (FAAH), with an IC50 of 11 nM, and both analgesic and antiinflammatory effects in animal studies. It was studied for the treatment of neuropathic pain and progressed to early stage human clinical trials by 2009.

See also 
 LY-2183240
 URB-597
 PF-3845
 BIA 10-2474

References

External links 
 

Enzyme inhibitors
Merck & Co. brands
Cannabinoids
Abandoned drugs
Oxazoles
Pyridines